Edward Victor Kolman (October 21, 1915 – July 31, 1985) was a professional American football player who played offensive tackle for six seasons for the Chicago Bears and New York Giants.

External links

1915 births
1985 deaths
Sportspeople from Brooklyn
Players of American football from New York City
American football offensive tackles
Temple Owls football players
Chicago Bears players
New York Giants players
New York Giants coaches
Boys High School (Brooklyn) alumni